Walter William Herger Jr. (born May 20, 1945) is an American politician who served as the U.S. representative for California's 2nd congressional district from 1987 to 2013. A member of the Republican Party, his district was the state's largest congressional district by area. It covered almost all of interior Northern California including Chico, Redding and Red Bluff. On January 10, 2012, Herger announced he would not seek re-election in November.

Early life, education, and early political career
Herger was born in Yuba City, California. He is of Swiss descent; his paternal grandfather emigrated to the US from the canton of Uri in the late 19th century. He is also of German and Irish descent. Herger was raised on his family's  cattle ranch and plum farm in the northern California town of Rio Oso (between Yuba City and Sacramento). He worked in the family's oil and gas exploration business.

He joined the Church of Jesus Christ of Latter-day Saints when he was about 20 years old. He graduated from American River College with an Associate of Arts. He also attended California State University, Sacramento for a year. His political career started in 1976, with his election to the East Nicolaus School Board. He also served northern California in the California State Assembly from 1980–86.

U.S. House of Representatives

Elections
Herger was easily reelected to Congress due to the "safe" Republican voter registration advantage in this district, but his election campaigns were challenged by Democratic candidates in his last campaigns. The district often fields a candidate registered with a third party, such as the Libertarian party and, during the 1990s, the Natural Law Party.

In 2002 and 2004, Herger defeated Democrat Mike Johnson, garnering 67% of the vote in 2004. In 2006, Herger faced Arjinderpal Sekhon and received 64% of the vote. In 2008, Herger faced Trinity County Supervisor Jeff Morris, who did somewhat better, holding Herger to 57% of the vote.

In 2010, Herger faced a Republican primary challenge from retired Colonel Pete Stiglich, and ran in the general against Democrat Jim Reed, a lawyer who divides his time between the Bay Area and Fall River. Herger prevailed with 57% of the vote.

Tenure

Herger served on the influential United States House Committee on Ways and Means since his tenure began as a federal representative. Within Ways and Means, Representative Herger served on two subcommittees, the Subcommittee on Trade, and the Subcommittee on Income Security and Family Support. In the 110th Congress he was named the Ranking Member of the Republican (minority) delegation to the Trade Subcommittee. Representative Herger's participation in full committee is limited to Ways and Means, in accordance with the rules of the Committee on Ways and Means. While he chaired the Subcommittee on Income Security and Family Support (called the Subcommittee on Human Resources during his watch) beginning with the 107th Congress, he played a leading role in the reauthorization and expansion of the 1996 welfare reform law. He sponsored the Criminal Welfare Prevention Act, passed as part of the larger 1996 Welfare Reform Law. This bill gave additional financial incentives to law enforcement agencies that identified fraudulent recipients of aid].

On August 18, 2009, Herger triggered controversy when he attended a town hall meeting in Redding, California, where an audience member introduced himself as a "proud right-wing terrorist" The person admitted to reporters in a private interview ten days latter, after the controversy had reached national attention, that he had misspoken, having intended to say "extremist". Herger did not immediately distance himself from the remark then and there, but, instead, after the constituent's lengthy comment, responded by saying, "Amen. God bless you. There goes a great American." Many people, both inside and outside Herger's congressional district found his failure to respond immediately unacceptable. Herger's gaffe attained the apotheosis of national media attention when Keith Olbermann picked the story up for his show Countdown with Keith Olbermann on August 28, 2009.

Legislative goals
The 2nd congressional district is driven by agriculture. Herger supported legislation to bolster free and fair trade in an effort to support his constituency. Congressman Herger, from his position on the Trade Subcommittee, planned  to lead the consideration of trade agreements with foreign nations. He worked on the Herger-Feinstein Quincy Library Group Forest Recovery Act, which instituted a framework for managing federal forest assets that will be tested on federal lands in Lassen, Plumas, and Tehama counties, and has been negotiated by a diverse coalition that includes environmental and logging interests. The act aims to reduce vegetation density in Forest Service lands, while expanding forest biodiversity (i.e. reduction of "monoculture" forests).

Congressmen Herger and Meek (D-FL) drafted a bill to repeal the three percent withholding tax scheduled to begin in 2011. The withholding tax would apply to governments with expenditures of greater than 100 million USD on services from for-profit companies. The law mandates that governments will only deliver 97 percent of a contract to the contractor, and send the remaining  3% to the IRS. Vendors and contractors are expected to increase their bid values to cover this new cost. The National Association of Counties thinks that this will give Counties a competitive disadvantage when dealing with vendors and contractors. (Counties assess costs of federal '3-percent withholding law')

Committee assignments
 Committee on Ways and Means
 Subcommittee on Trade
 Subcommittee on Health (Chairman)

Caucus memberships
 Congressional Biomass Caucus
 Congressional Caucus on Turkey and Turkish Americans
 Republican Study Committee
 Tea Party Caucus

Personal life
Herger is married to Pamela Sargent, with whom he has 9 children and 19 grandchildren.  He is a member of The Church of Jesus Christ of Latter-day Saints and used to sit  on the United States House Committee on Ways and Means.

Electoral history

References

External links
 Congressman Wally Herger official U.S. House website
 Wally Herger for Congress 
 
 
 News about Wally Herger from ABC News
 Wally Herger News and Photos from the Chicago Tribune
 
 Join California Wally Herger

|-

1945 births
Living people
Republican Party members of the California State Assembly
Latter Day Saints from California
Converts to Mormonism
American people of German descent
American people of Irish descent
American people of Swiss descent
American River College alumni
People from Chico, California
California State University, Sacramento alumni
Tea Party movement activists
Republican Party members of the United States House of Representatives from California
People from Yuba City, California
Activists from California
21st-century American politicians
20th-century American politicians